Year 224 (CCXXIV) was a leap year starting on Thursday (link will display the full calendar) of the Julian calendar. At the time, it was known as the Year of the Consulship of Iulianus and Crispinus (or, less frequently, year 977 Ab urbe condita). The denomination 224 for this year has been used since the early medieval period, when the Anno Domini calendar era became the prevalent method in Europe for naming years.

Events 
 By place 

 Parthia 
 April 28 – Battle of Hormozdgan: King Ardashir I defeats Artabanus V, destroying the Parthian Empire, and establishing the Sassanid Dynasty. Artabanus V's brother Vologases VI will continue to rule, with Armenian and Kushan support, over outlying parts of Parthia.

Births 
 Jungcheon of Goguryeo, Korean ruler (d. 270)
 Liu Xuan (or Wenheng), Chinese prince (d. 264)
 Marcus Aurelius Carus, Roman emperor (d. 283)
 Mercurius, Christian saint and martyr (d. 250)
 Pei Xiu, Chinese official and politician (d. 271)
 Sun He (or Zixiao), Chinese prince (d. 253)

Deaths 
 April 28 – Artabanus IV, king of Parthia
 Du Ji, Chinese official and politician 
 Ji Yan, Chinese official and politician
 Zhu Zhi, Chinese general and politician (b. 156)

References